The Chinese New Left is a term used in the People's Republic of China to describe a diverse range of left-wing political philosophies that emerged in the 1990s that are critical of the economic reforms instituted under Deng Xiaoping, which emphasized policies of market liberalization and privatization to promote economic growth and modernization.

Chinese academic Wang Hui links the emergence of New Leftism with the financial crisis of 1997 and the 1999 United States bombing of the Chinese embassy in Belgrade, which damaged the credibility of liberalism in China, as well as the 1989 Tiananmen Square protests and massacre. The Chinese New Left enjoyed prominence especially with the rise of Chongqing Communist Party secretary Bo Xilai, who promoted a set of socio-economic policies collectively termed the "Chongqing model", though they suffered a blow after the end of Bo's career in 2012 due to the Wang Lijun incident. The Chinese New Left has been involved in several incidents and events under the leadership of Xi Jinping, most prominently the Jasic incident.

There is an ambiguity of the term New Left in discourse drawing from the diversity of the movement, generally speaking, the New Left can be applied to a person who embraces leftist theories, ideals and traditions rooted in variations of socialist ideology, and other schools criticizing postmodernism and neoliberalism.

The New Left's relationship with Maoism and capitalism is complicated. Although some schools of thought suggest that the New Left wants the return to mass political movements of the Mao Zedong era and an abandonment of capitalism, others believe that it combines capitalism's open markets with socialist elements (particularly in rural China). Additionally, the views within the New Left are diverse, ranging from hardline Maoists to more moderate social democrats. New Left supporters such as Cui Zhiyuan and Wang Hui are skeptical about liberalism and free market capitalism.

Terminology

The term was first used by Chinese journalist Yang Ping, who published a review in the 21 July 1994 issue of Beijing Youth Daily about Cui Zhiyuan's article "New Evolution, Analytical Marxism, Critical Law, and China's Reality", remarking that China had produced its own "New Left wing".

Although many New Left intellectuals oppose certain Maoist approaches, the term "New Left" implies some agreement with Maoism. Since it is associated with the ultra-leftism of the Cultural Revolution, many scholars and intellectuals supporting socialist approaches and reforms but opposing the radical, brutal approaches of the Maoist period do not completely accept the "New Left" label. Some are concerned about the fact that adopting leftism implies that China, historically different from the West, is still using a Western model to strategise its reforms and would be limited by how the West defines the Left. Wang Hui explains the origin of, and his skepticism about, the term:

However, Xu Youyu points out that Wang Hui's performance in his interview with the New Left Review suggests that he fully understood that the term was inevitably generated by social change and intellectual antagonism in China.

Origin
The concept of the New Left arose in China during the 1990s. After the failure of liberal movements in the 1980s, Deng Xiaoping's 1992 trip to Shenzhen and the 14th Party Congress in 1992, scholars and media figures began to adopt a more critical stand towards marketization and its consequences—including (but not limited to) social and economic inequalities between the coast and the hinterlands, urban and rural areas, and rich and poor people. According to New Left theory, market-economy challenges stem from the fact that under Chinese economic reform, the market economy has become the dominant economic system; China's socialist economic reforms have brought the country into the global capitalist sphere.

The development of the New Left is correlated to increased Chinese nationalism after its period of low-profile presence on the world stage during the Deng Xiaoping era. It is seen as a response to problems faced by China during its modernization drive since the 1980s, which has led to growing social inequality between coast and hinterlands and rich and poor. Some scholars believe that, based on its unique and drastic 20th-century economic and political changes, China cannot adopt the social-democratic, capitalist model of many Western countries. Some critics say that the early-20th-century New Culture Movement's embrace of enlightenment went too far in identifying the West with modernization, and China needs to find its own path to modernity.

The Chinese New Left is concerned with the country's social-inequality issues. Some scholars believe that although the movement is not yet mature, it is likely to embed itself in Chinese society over the next century (assuming that polarization continues). Strikes, sit-ins, slow-downs and peasant uprisings, sporadic due to government suppression, are on the rise and may become more organized with the development of the New Left.

Although they are skeptical and critical of capitalism, New Leftists recognize its influence on China and discuss the strengths and weaknesses of capitalist models. Cui Zhiyuan, a leading New Left intellectual, believes that it is imperative that socialism and capitalism are not viewed as opposites. According to Zhang Xudong, "An advocate for New Deal-style economic and social policies in China was considered to be liberal in the 1980s, but as 'New Left' by the century's end." This overlap suggests that ideals set forth by the New Left strongly resemble the democratic socialism of the 1980s.

Beijing Consensus
The phrase "Beijing Consensus" was coined by Joshua Cooper Ramo to frame China's economic development model as an alternative, especially for developing countries, to the Washington Consensus of market-friendly policies promoted by the IMF, the World Bank, and the U.S. Treasury.

Although the debate at the time revolved around management buyouts (MBOs) and the protection of private property, it actually considered the issues of privatization and socialism. Discussion became so heated that Hu Jintao and Wen Jiabao went out of their way to reiterate their support for reform  at the 2006 National People's Congress. Debates about MBOs and property rights were extensions of the strongly-ideological debate over socialism versus capitalism that emerged after the 1989 Tiananmen Square protests and massacre, only quieting in the wake of Deng Xiaoping's 1992 trip to Shenzhen and the subsequent 14th National Congress of the Chinese Communist Party that year. Deng's call for economic reform unleashed market forces and a series of often-wasteful, duplicative investment. In the wake of this upsurge of market activity, the New Left (a loose-knit group of young intellectuals) emerged and began developing a new critique of China's economic and social path.

Views

Economics
Economics plays a significant role in the Chinese New Left, whose development is closely associated with Chinese economic reform. Many supporters of the New Left generally believe that a leftist economic model should be found to tackle China's dependence on exports and savings, reduce the growing economic gap between rural and urban areas and stimulate private business through public ownership and state planning. The capitalist free-market model applied in most social-democratic programs is undesirable because instead of challenging and reforming the existing market economy and representative democracy, it seeks to moderate the social consequences of structural division and hierarchy. A suitable, sustainable market model is vital for China's leftist movement.

New Left economist Cui Zhiyuan believes that a labour-capital partnership, based on the ideas of James Meade and John Maynard Keynes, can be used to introduce some flexibility to the labour market. Outside shareholders own capital-share certificates; workers own labour and share certificates, which replace a fixed wage and reduce the conflict of interest between workers and capitalists. Any decision that will improve one group (by raising the dividend on its share) will automatically raise the dividend on the shares of the other group. Many New Left intellectuals are confident in the outcome of collective economic-development planning, anticipating rural industrialization.

Human rights

Some Chinese New Leftists prioritize universal human rights. According to Hu Ping, the most important human right is freedom of speech. During the Great Leap Forward, grain production decreased and it became evident that many people were beginning to starve. However (as reported by newspapers), the following harvest would be ample. Hu wrote:

Other members of the Chinese New Left, particularly since the Great Recession, have rejected the centrality of human rights and universal values in general. These theorists have argued for the construction of an authoritarian Chinese political government separate from Western intellectual traditions.

Traditional Chinese culture
The New Left movement has shown some convergence with the Confucian revival movement in China, who advocate restoration of ancient Chinese cultural traditions such as filial piety and especially the civil service examinations. Both ideologies emerged in the late 1990s as a nationalist reaction to the dominance of neoliberalism in China. Leftists and Confucians are increasingly demonstrating a degree of reciprocity. Chinese leader Xi Jinping declared that "to solve China's problems... [China needs] to fully make use of the great wisdom accumulated by the Chinese nation over the last 5,000 years.” Academics such as Sun Yat-sen University's Gan Yang have identified as both leftist and Confucian, and a 2015 paper by Harvard and MIT researchers have found that Chinese netizens tend to congregate into two camps, one side an internationalist, democratic, free market faction, and another a pro-traditional culture, nationalistic, socialist faction. Each camp showed a high level of ideological unity.

Social movements
According to the Financial Times in 2016, several experts estimate that if there were free elections in China, a neo-Maoist candidate would win. This Maoist revival movement precedes the tenure of Xi Jinping, whose own revival of Mao-era elements seem to be intended as a conciliatory move towards the neo-Maoists. It is believed that the rising popularity of neo-Maoism is due to the growing economic dislocation and inequality under market reforms and globalisation.

Critiques of Jiang Zemin's 2001 decision to allow private business people to become party members as "political misconduct" and "ideological confusions" helped fuel the rise of what would become known as the New Left movement. 

Neo-Maoists first became prominent under Hu Jintao's administration, delivering far-left attacks on CCP policy from websites such as Utopia, or MaoFlag. They expanded into a political movement through association with the Chongqing Party Secretary and princeling Bo Xilai, and succeeded in surviving crackdowns. It is believed that the CCP leadership is reluctant to eradicate these groups due to their connection with CCP history and ideology.

Maoism and neo-Maoism have been increasingly popular after the rise of Xi Jinping among millennials and poor Chinese people, and they are more frequently covered by foreign media. Due to CCP suppression of proletarian movements and protests, tensions between the party and New Left groups are increasing.

The Xi administration, while imposing political controls on businesses, has also promoted greater economic liberalisation in Shenzhen which was then held up as a model for the rest of China. In September 2020, the former mayor and party chief of Shenzhen Li Youwei published a sharply-worded commentary in Wen Wei Po, warning that due to the resurgence of leftists discussing class struggle, China was at a crossroads for economic reform. In 2021, The New York Times reported that Maoism is being revived among China's generation Z due to China's growing wealth gap and the 996 working hour system, as they  call for a crackdown on capitalists and posting "À la lanterne!" on the social medias.

Hu era

Nanjie Village and land reform

National Public Radio's website posted a story about Nanjie on 13 May 2011, calling it a prime example of recent "re-collectivizations" inspired by Mao's ideas: "The furniture and appliances in each home are identical, including the big red clocks with Chairman Mao's head, radiating psychedelic colours to the tune "The East Is Red." [Villager] Huang Zunxian owns virtually nothing in his apartment. The possessions are owned by the collective, right down to the couch cushions .... " Some villages around the country have followed Nanjie's example and re-collectivized."

During the 1990s, rural industry began to stagnate and China's large peasant population was seen as a hindrance to the country's development. Popular demand for further modernization, urbanization and marketization began to outweigh the successes of the previous Township and Village Enterprises. Cui Zhiyuan and Gan Yang began to establish small, rural industries and collectives to mitigate the increasing socioeconomic gap and provide an alternative to large-scale capitalism.

Although Hegang has had the largest number of laid-off workers since 1996, the city has registered China's highest rate of economic growth. Cui Zhiyuan suggests that the cause of this phenomenon is its "combining public land ownership and the market"; Hegang has focused on stimulating its real estate market to stimulate the development of related industries.

Of the Chinese Communist Party's current ideology, the idea of privatising China's countryside has not been accepted and it remains in public hands. Although most non-urban land is used privately, it cannot be sold (unlike urban property).

In 2008, the Third Session of the 17th Central Committee of the Chinese Communist Party began a new round of land-privatization reforms, but these measures were limited; the transfer of land remains ambiguous, not "officially endorsed and encouraged".

Zhengzhou incident
On 24 December 2004, four Chinese protesters were sentenced to three-year prison terms for distributing leaflets entitled "Mao Forever Our Leader" at a gathering in Zhengzhou honouring Mao Zedong on the anniversary of his birth. Attacking the current leadership as "imperialist revisionists," the leaflets called on lower-level cadres to "change the current line (of the party) and return to the socialist road". The Zhengzhou incident is one of the first manifestations of public nostalgia for the Mao era reported by the international press, although it is unclear whether these feelings are widespread. It is an example of Marxist Chinese New Leftism in action.

Chinese New Leftists are often criticised by liberal intellectuals such as Liu Junning, who consider China as not liberal enough economically and politically. These liberals think that inequality and the widening gap between rich and poor are serious problems which exist in every developing country. Democracy and personal freedom are seen as important for China, although perhaps not attainable in the near future.

Maoist Communist Party of China
A group of workers and students formed the Maoist Communist Party of China in 2008, an underground, non-recognized political party opposing the ruling Communist Party government. A reported party manifesto, The Ten Declarations of the Maoist Communist Party of China, was posted on the Internet in which the legitimacy of the Chinese Communist Party was questioned. The party advocates a reversal of the Deng Xiaoping reforms and a return to socialism.

Chongqing model
Politician Bo Xilai was promoted in October 2007 to party chief of Chongqing, a troubled province with high levels of pollution and unemployment and poor public health. Bo began a policy of expanding state-owned industries in contrast with the rest of China, which was embracing market reforms. He led an economic reform of the region which was known as the Chongqing model and focused on expanding state influence in the economy, anti-corruption campaigns, and the promotion of "Red Culture". The policy also supported strong public welfare programs for the poor, unemployed, and elderly.

Bo began the Red Culture Movement in 2008, which promoted Maoist culture in opposition to the capitalist culture that characterized the Chinese reformists. Radio and television played Maoist propaganda and students were organized to "return to the countryside" and promote the singing of "red songs" during this period.

From 2009 to 2011, Chongqing began prosecuting alleged Triad members in the Chongqing gang trials. An estimated 4,781 people were arrested during the crackdown. The prosecution was controversial in its use of torture, forced confessions, and inhumane treatment of witnesses.

In 2013, Bo was found guilty of corruption and sentenced to life imprisonment; he is incarcerated at Qincheng Prison. Bo was removed as Chongqing's party chief and lost his seat on the Politburo. Bo's supporters formed the Zhi Xian Party to protest his conviction, but it was swiftly banned.

Xi era

2015 Luoyang meeting 

In February 2015, a group from 13 provinces and municipalities of China, calling themselves "Chinese Maoists Communists" held a two-day secret meeting in Luoyang, calling for a "new socialist revolution" to "reverse  the restoration of capitalism". The group seemed to claim to have party elders as backers. The group was quietly arrested. Luoyang was an industrial area that declined after the Chinese economic reforms of the 1990s and experienced extensive unemployment as a result. Maoist nostalgia is pervasive in the city. The neo-Maoists received online support across many blogs, Weibo, and websites such as RedChina.net. However some neo-Maoist groups refused to back it, typically those who regarded Xi Jinping's policies as sufficiently aligned to their neo-Maoist agenda.

2017 Guangzhou incident
In November 2017, a group of Maoist students and workers was arrested in Guangzhou for organizing a Maoist salon.

2018 Cultural Revolution anniversary celebrations
On the 52nd anniversary of the beginning of the Cultural Revolution, dozens of neo-Maoists from all over China gathered in Hong Kong for commemorations, saying that their activities had been banned in the mainland. They wore Mao-era blue military uniforms and waved hammer-and-sickle flags. These Maoist groups are highly critical of the CCP's market economics which they claim are responsible for rising inequality and corruption.

Jasic protests
A number of Maoist students participated in the July–August 2018 Jasic incident, protesting in support of factory workers and workers' rights. The students formed the Jasic Workers Solidarity Group, which included #Me Too advocate Yue Xin. The rally was largely organized through the popular Far-left neo-Maoist online forum website Utopia. On 11 October, fifty student advocates were arrested; their whereabouts are unknown. Political suppression has been expanded to universities, factories and the general public. Student leaders of the Jasic protests have been detained, punished and subjected to forced education by the CCP.

Common prosperity 
After Xi's emphasis on a more equal society and promotion of the term "common prosperity", Li Guangman, a retired newspaper editor affiliated with the Chinese New Left, published an article that claims a "profound revolution" was close that would take the party closer to masculinity and its socialist roots. Major Chinese state news agencies published the article, including People's Daily and Xinhua News Agency, setting off widespread worries about parallels to the Cultural Revolution. In response, the news agencies tried to downplay the incident by not carrying the article in their print versions, some of them removing the article from their sites and, in the case of People's Daily, publishing a front-page editorial in support of market forces.

New New Left 
In the period following the COVID-19 pandemic, a Radio Free Asia article in Chinese reported that some Chinese left-wing youths, influenced by factors such as the 996 working hour system, began to increasingly oppose the authorities, and to distinguish themselves from the statist tendencies of Wang Hui and other New Left scholars, they called themselves the "new New Left".

Criticism
Criticism of the New Left in China has focused on whether the national conservatism and cultural conservatism that has emerged in the course of their development is contrary to the left-wing ideological system and, by extension, on the question of whether the New Left really exists in China.

In 2010, when asked about the difference between the New Left in China and the New Left in the West, Professor Ding Xueliang of the Social Sciences Department of the Hong Kong University of Science and Technology replied that "there is no New Left in China at all, because the primary claim of the New Left is that human rights are greater than sovereignty", "The New Left in the West, they oppose the governments of their own countries on the one hand and the monopolies of their own countries on the other. Although their practical path may not be realistic, they at least have courage. The 'New Left' in China mostly appeals to the government, so how can this be called the New Left?"

See also

Anarchism in China
Huaxi Village
Left communism in China
Nanjie
Red Guards
Red tourism

References

External links
 
 
 
 
 

About Chinese 'New Left' theorist Wang Hui:
 
 

 
Communism in China
History of the People's Republic of China
Maoism in China
Marxism
Political movements in China
Political theories
Politics of China
Postmodernism